MTV Unplugged is the first live album by Australian alternative rock group, The Rubens. The album was released on 10 May 2019.

Background
On 30 January 2019, the MTV Unplugged Melbourne concert series announced The Rubens as the first act of 2019. The performance took place on Thursday 28 February at the Esplanade Hotel in St Kilda before a live audience and screened on 14 March 2019.
On 15 March 2019, the album was announced with a date set in May.

Reception
MTV said "The album feels like a timeline of the band's progressions as both artists and songwriters, as they seamlessly perform a tightrope walk between the raw and the refined." adding "The band have completely transported the listener to a magical evening that happened months ago, yet it still feels fresh, exciting and like they're right there in front of you."

Track listing

Release history

References

2019 live albums
Live albums by Australian artists
MTV Unplugged albums
The Rubens albums
Ivy League Records albums